Narangba railway station is located on the North Coast line in Queensland, Australia. It serves the suburb of Narangba in the Moreton Bay Region.

History
Narangba station first opened in 1888 as Sideling Creek. In 2013, an upgrade of the station was completed. The upgrade included a new footbridge and lifts. During the upgrade, platform 3 was closed, with northbound services using platform 2.

Services
Narangba station is served by all City network services from Nambour and Caboolture to Roma Street, many continuing to Springfield Central, Ipswich and Rosewood.

Services by platform

Transport Links
Kangaroo Bus Lines operate two routes to and from Narangba station:
663: Narangba loop service
668: to North Lakes

References

External links

Narangba station Queensland Rail
Narangba station Queensland's Railways on the Internet

Railway stations in Australia opened in 1888
Railway stations in Moreton Bay Region
North Coast railway line, Queensland